Stross is an uncommon British surname. It may refer to:

 Barnett Stross (1899–1967), British doctor and politician
 Charles Stross (born 1964), writer based in Edinburgh, Scotland; grandnephew of Barnett Stross
 Raymond Stross (1915–1988), British film producer